Eckert is a ghost town,  northeast of Fredericksburg in Gillespie County, in the U.S. state of Texas. West of Willow City, on FM 1323, Eckert is at the junction of State Highway 16.

White settlers came to the area in 1875 and built Mount Zion, a log church.

A post office appointment was offered to, and declined by, George W. Graves in 1903. When Wilhelm Rudolph Eckert opened a store in the location in 1903, he became the first postmaster of Eckert. At his request, Nebo was renamed Eckert.

The population peaked in 1925 at 100, but is today a ghost town. It does not have a zip code of its own, but shares the Willow City zip code. The small Eckert Cemetery lies just north of the community.

Further reading

References

Ghost towns in Central Texas
Geography of Gillespie County, Texas
Populated places established in 1875
Populated places in Gillespie County, Texas